The economy of the Organisation of Islamic Cooperation (OIC) combines the economies of 57 member states. 53 are predominantly Muslim states. , the combined GDP (nominal) of 49 Muslim majority countries was US$5.7 trillion. , they contributed 8% of the world's total. Those 57 OIC countries have a combined GDP (at Purchasing power parity; PPP) of US$22.149 trillion. The richest country on the basis of GDP per capita at PPP is United Arab Emirates. On basis of per capita GDP, Qatar is richest country with incomes exceeding US$133,357 per capita. According to a report by Salam Standard, the GDP impact of the world’s Muslim tourism sector exceeded $138 billion in 2015, generating 4.3 million jobs and contributing more than $18 billion in tax revenue.

Statistics
 
*Observer nations in italic

Economic Growth for 5 years (GDP)

See also

 List of Organisation of Islamic Cooperation member states by population
 List of Organisation of Islamic Cooperation member states by GDP (PPP)
 List of Organisation of Islamic Cooperation member states by exports
 List of Organisation of Islamic Cooperation member states by imports
 Middle East economic integration
 Economy of the Arab League
 Economy of the European Union

Notes

References

External links

Statistical, Economic and Social Research and Training Centre for Islamic Countries
Islamic Development Bank

Organisation of Islamic Cooperation
Islamic economics